Jeslynn Kuijpers (born 23 June 1995) is a Dutch professional footballer who plays as a forward and captains Eredivisie club PSV.

Club career
Kuijpers started her career with her hometown club SC 't Zand at the age of eight. On 21 April 2011, she made her Eredivisie debut for Willem II, which had a partnership with SC 't Zand. She joined VVV-Venlo in June that year following the withdrawal of Willem II from women's football.

Kuijpers joined newly formed PSV in June 2012. On 13 September 2020, she became the first player to play 200 matches for the team.

International career
Kuijpers has represented Netherlands at various youth levels. She was part of Netherlands under-19 team which won 2014 UEFA Women's Under-19 Championship. She made her senior team debut on 10 April 2016 in a 2–1 friendly defeat against Canada.

Career statistics

International

References

External links
 
Under-19 national team profile at Onsoranje.nl (in Dutch)
Under-17 national team profile at Onsoranje.nl (in Dutch)
Under-16 national team profile at Onsoranje.nl (in Dutch)
Under-15 national team profile at Onsoranje.nl (in Dutch)

1995 births
Living people
Footballers from Tilburg
Women's association football forwards
Dutch women's footballers
Netherlands women's international footballers
Eredivisie (women) players
Willem II (women) players
VVV-Venlo (women) players
PSV (women) players